One Last Ride is a 2004 American drama film directed by Tony Vitale and starring Patrick Cupo, Chazz Palminteri, Robert Davi, Charles Durning and Anita Barone.  It is based on Cupo's play of the same name and Ang Lee served as an executive producer of the film.

Cast
Patrick Cupo as Michael
Chazz Palminteri as Tweat
Robert Davi as Michael's Father
Anita Barone as Gina
Jack Carter as Sid
Joe Marinelli as Carmine
Mario Roccuzzo as Charlie Figs
Tracey Walter as Nicky
Tony Lee as Richie
Charles Durning as Orlick

Production
Filming began in Los Angeles on January 25, 2003.

Release
The film premiered at the Method Fest Independent Film Festival on April 5, 2004.

Reception
Robert Koehler of Variety gave the film a positive review and wrote, "The potent cast, Tony Vitale’s assured direction and a solid foundation with lead thesp Patrick Cupo adapting his own play help mitigate many of the pic’s deficiencies..."

References

External links
 
 

2000s Italian-language films
American films based on plays
American drama films
2000s English-language films
2000s American films